Jheringsfehn (frequently misspelt Iheringsfehn) is a fen settlement in the municipality of Moormerland in the district of Leer in East Frisia near the North Sea coast of Germany. It was named in 1754 after Sebastian Eberhard Jhering (1700-1759), great grandfather of Rudolf von Jhering. The village still has its classic fen canals. Important elements of village life are the local sports club and the Lutheran church, which also covers the neighbouring village of Boekzetelerfehn. The church stands on the boundary between the two villages.

The parish chairman (Ortsbürgermeister) is Arnold Eyhusen (SPD).

Leer (district)
Towns and villages in East Frisia